Abaradira was a Roman era city in the Roman province of Byzacena. Its exact location is unknown but it would have been in the central part of what is today Tunisia.

Abaradira was also the seat of an ancient bishopric. Only one bishop is known from antiquity, a bishop by the name of Praefectianus who was called by the Vandal king Huneric to a conference in 484 AD and sent into exile shortly after this. Abaradira survives as titular bishopric and the title is now held by Marko Semren, auxiliary bishop of Banja Luka, Bosnia.

See also

References

Roman towns and cities in Africa (Roman province)
Catholic titular sees in Africa